Golam Mujtaba (born 16 December 1955) is a Pakistani-American Muhajir politician. He served as the provincial advisor in Sindh from 1992 to 1994. He was the leader of the coalition party to the Sindh Government from 1992 to 1994. Previously, he had been a student activist; he was elected General Secretary of the Karachi University Students Union in 1976, and served as a member of the University Senate and Syndicate in 1976–78.

He is currently chair of the Pakistan Policy Institute in the United States.

Early life and family 

Mujtaba was born in Karachi in December 1955. His father, Gholam Mustafa of Patna, Bihar, was a graduate of Calcutta University and the General Secretary of the Muslim Students Federation Calcutta chapter in the Pakistan independence movement. His wife Kulsum Mujtaba was the niece of the founding Prime Minister of Pakistan, Liaqat Ali Khan, and daughter of Dr. Abdul Majeed Khan Rao, a medical practitioner in Karachi. She died of cancer in September 2016.

Education 
Mujtaba Received his early education at the Airport Model School in Karachi, Rajshahi Cadet College, Modern Standard High School in Lahore and Jamia Millia College in Karachi. 

He completed a Bachelor of Pharmacy from the Faculty of Pharmacy at the University of Karachi in 1978, While studying, he was the faculty representative to Karachi University Students Union and the chair of the Literary and Debating Society in 1975. He became the General Secretary of Karachi University Students Union from 1976 to 1978, and a member of the university's Syndicate and Senate in the same period. 

He completed a Master of Science in Pharmacology at King's College London in 1987. He received a Doctorate in Medicine from the American International School of Medicine in 2004, and was awarded a Doctorate in Education by Argosy University in 2016. His doctoral dissertation was entitled "The Perception of Pro-United States Pakistanis on the Styles of Civilian and Military Leadership", and was approved in November 2016

Career 
Mujtaba was the President of the Pharmacy Teachers Association of Pakistan from 1987 to 1988. From 1988 to 1992 he was the Chief Organizer of the National Peoples Party overseas. 

Mujtaba was the leader of the coalition party to the Sindh Government, with the majority support of members of the Provincial Assembly. Though he lost the elections in 1993 to the largest constituency of the National Assembly of Pakistan, he remained a key cabinet adviser to the Chief Minister of Sindh.

Mujtaba was also the Central Vice President of the All Pakistan Muslim League (APML), and was a close associate of President Pervez Musharraf during his last days in power. However, he later developed differences with Musharraf over issues related to an ethnic party of Karachi, and resigned from the APML.

He is currently chair of the Pakistan Policy Institute in the United States.

Works 

Mujtaba is the author of a number of publications on cardiovascular pharmacology, as well as several international articles on current affairs.

He wrote his first book, Waqiya-e-Meraj in relevance to contemporary science, discussing Islamic history of the past 1400 years in relation to present-day science, to manifest the journey of Al-Isra Wal Meraj.

He wrote two other books in 2018, Haj & Umra, and The Political Ecology of Pakistan.

References 

1955 births
Living people
University of Karachi alumni
All Pakistan Muslim League politicians
Alumni of King's College London
Muhajir people
Pakistani emigrants to the United States
American pharmacologists
Pakistani pharmacologists
Politicians from Karachi